Bandaranaike International Airport (BIA) (commonly known as Colombo International Airport, Colombo–Bandaranaike and locally as Katunayake Airport)  is the main international airport serving Sri Lanka. It is administered by Airport and Aviation Services (Sri Lanka) Ltd and serves as the hub of SriLankan Airlines, the national carrier of Sri Lanka, and domestic carrier Cinnamon Air. The other airport serving the city of Colombo is Colombo International Airport, Ratmalana.

History

The airport began as a Royal Air Force airfield in 1944 during the Second World War, RAF Negombo with No. 45 Squadron RAF (1946–49), No. 232 Squadron RAF (1945), No. 249 Squadron RAF (1950) and No. 1303 Flight RAF (1945–46). In 1957, Prime minister S. W. R. D. Bandaranaike removed all the British Military airfields from Ceylon (Sri Lanka), and the airfield was handed over to the Royal Ceylon Air Force (RCyAF) and renamed Katunayake; part of it still remains a military airfield. In 1964 Anil Moonesinghe, the Minister of Communications, started the building of a new international airport to replace Ratmalana, with Canadian aid. The airport was completed in 1967, and Air Ceylon, the national carrier, began international operations from it using a Hawker Siddeley Trident and a leased British Overseas Airways Corporation (BOAC) British Aircraft Corporation (BAC) VC-10. It was named after former Prime Minister SWRD Bandaranaike, in 1970. It was renamed Katunayake International Airport in 1977, but was changed back to Bandaranaike International Airport in 1995.

On 7 November 1971, the first Boeing 747 landed at the airport. The Boeing 747-200B was operated by Condor carrying German tourists from Frankfurt. In the early 1990s the position of the airport's runway (04/22) was shifted northward and the old runway was made into a taxiway for departing and arriving aircraft. Airport expansion projects have recently been undertaken at the airport under the Stage 1, Phase II Expansion Project. A pier with eight aero-bridges opened in November 2005. A new terminal with an additional eight gates are proposed to be built under Stage II of the Phase II Expansion Project. Construction of the new Stage II, Phase II Expansion Project is expected to commence in April 2017 and is expected to be completed by 2020.

On 7 May 2007, the Sri Lankan Government shifted military aviation operations out of the space adjoining the airport to SLAF Hingurakgoda, thus paving the way for the expansion of civilian operations. As part of the airport development program, a passenger train service was launched between the Airport and Colombo Secretariat Station, in June 2010. The airport is used by Emirates as an alternative emergency airport for its Airbus A380 aircraft. On 9 January 2012, an Airbus A380-800 operated by Emirates landed at Bandaranaike International Airport. This was the first time in history that an Airbus A380 had landed in a Sri Lankan airport.

SriLankan Airlines is the largest airline operating at the airport, with a fleet of 27 Airbus aircraft.

In the past, British Airways, KLM, Kuwait Airways, LTU International, Royal Jordanian Airlines, Saudia and Swissair are the airlines that previously served Colombo for many years.

Facilities

Terminals
Bandaranaike International Airport (airport code CMB) at Katunayake, Sri Lanka, is 32.5 kilometers north of the island nation's capital of Colombo. Thirty seven(37) airlines currently serve the airport's over 10.79 million annual passengers. The airport has three passenger terminals. Terminal 1 is the current international terminal, built in 1967. Terminal 2 is the new international terminal, which is expected to be completed in 2019. Terminal 3 is the new domestic terminal, which opened in November 2012.

Terminal 1 opened in 1967 and is the oldest and largest terminal in the airport. It has 12 gates. The arrival and departure areas are separated horizontally. All international flights currently use this terminal, until Terminal 2 opens in 2019. The terminal consists of a main terminal building directly connected to one concourse which houses all the gates. Once past security, passengers proceed through the long, arm-shaped concourse housing gates 6–14. On the upper level of this concourse, there are two lounges. In the main body of the terminal is SriLankan Airlines' "Serendib Lounge", and the Palm Spirit lounge. This area has duty-free shops, a tea shop, a cafeteria, a smoking lounge, and day-rooms & showers. 
Terminal 2 is planned to open in 2019. It is planned to have 8 gates, with arrival and departure areas separated vertically. A new terminal with eight more gates is proposed to be built under Stage II of the Phase II Expansion Project. Construction of the new Stage II, Phase II Expansion Project was commenced in April 2017 and is expected to be completed in 2019. A new pier with eight boarding gates and 14 passenger boarding bridges, with an additional gate comprising two passenger boarding bridges for the Airbus A380, will be included in the proposed new development.
Terminal 3 opened in November 2012 and handles all domestic flights. Its arrival and departure areas are separated horizontally.
 The Cargo Terminal opened in October 2009 and handles all cargo flights. Its arrival and departure areas are separated horizontally.

Aprons
 Apron Alpha: It is the oldest existing apron at the airport. It has 9 parking bays including 5 remote parking bays and 4 boarding bridge equipped bays. It can handle 4 Boeing 747 aircraft and 5 Airbus A330-200 aircraft at once.
 Apron Bravo: It has 8 parking bays, including 4 remote parking bays and 4 boarding bridge equipped bays. It can handle any 8 wide-body such as an Airbus A330, Airbus A340, Boeing 777 or Boeing 747 at once. The 4 remote bays will be converted into 4 Airbus A380 capable boarding bridges under the Stage II development project.
 Apron Charlie: It has 8 parking bays, all of them are currently remote bays. It can handle any 8 wide-body such as an Airbus A330, Airbus A340, Boeing 777 or Boeing 747 at once. The remote bays will be converted into 8 Airbus A380 capable boarding bridges under the Stage II development project. It is the only apron that is currently capable of handling the Airbus A380-800. It has been used by Emirates Airbus A380s thrice.
 Apron Delta: It has 4 parking bays capable of handling narrow-body aircraft.
 Apron Echo: Newest apron of the airport, that has 17 parking bays. Opened on 25th November 2021.

Runway
The Bandaranaike International Airport has a single runway (04/22), with an asphalt surface. The take-off and landing distances are 3,441 m and 3,350 m respectively. In addition, Phase II of the BIA expansion project is to have a second runway, also able to accommodate the A380, with another taxiway to the second runway.

Available frequencies
Bandaranaike International Airport Approach - 132.4Mhz

Bandaranaike International Airport Tower    - 118.7Mhz

Expansion projects

The airport is undergoing resurfacing of its runway. Future projects include a second runway to support the Airbus A380, a further eight passenger gates, a domestic terminal, a five-storey car-park, and a five-star hotel neighbouring the airport. Construction of the new approach channels to the airport will begin in April 2017.

A new split-level passenger terminal building, which separates arrivals and departures vertically, a new pier with eight boarding gates, and fourteen passenger boarding bridges, with a dedicated gate comprising two passenger boarding bridges for the new Airbus A380, will be included in the proposed new complex. There would also be a remote apron and an additional nine parking stands to ease air traffic movement. There would be a tax-free apparel shopping mall at the Katunayake BOI Zone to attract more business visitors to Sri Lanka. The mall is to be adjacent to the arrival terminal and connected by a sky bridge.

Under the Development Project Phase II, Stage 2, a second passenger terminal and a required utility for second terminal will be constructed. Work will also be carried out to expand the terminal, aircraft parking apron, and public utilities. The existing airport terminal will be converted to a domestic and regional terminal, when the new complex is ready. A two tier passenger terminal with arrivals and departures physically separated as found in most modern airports will also be constructed. A rapid exit to the Colombo – Katunayake Highway will be provided directly from the terminal. 

The project has been divided into two packages and the bidding has been completed for both packages.

The construction work of Package B –"Remote Apron and Taxiways" commenced in April 2017.

The bids for Package A- "Terminal building and associated works" are under evaluation. Construction is expected to commence by November 2017 with the selection of the main contractor.

Project phases and construction 
The second phase of the expansion project is being carried out with Japanese assistance and is expected to be completed by 2024
November 2007 to August 2014 – Development stage of Phase II.
The new design, submitted in July 2014, provided a green terminal, utilizing the sun with more eco-friendly concepts incorporated.
On 7 Sep 2014, the Japanese premier launched stage 2 of the second phase of the BIA development project on his arrival at the airport, which is being funded by the Japanese Government.
2017–2020, the construction for the new terminal will commence in April 2017 and will be completed in 2019.
The Construction of Phase II was re-launched on the 18th of November 2020.
Expected to be completed in 2024

Airlines and destinations

Passenger

Cargo

Statistics

Ground transportation

Bus 
A coach service operates every 15 minutes from the terminal to Colombo via  Colombo – Katunayake Expressway, with a travel time of around 30 minutes.

Car 
 Colombo – Katunayake Expressway is a new high-speed road linking the airport to the city of Colombo with a travel time of around 20 minutes, and just a few minutes to the city of Negombo. The airport taxi service operates a counter in the arrival Lobby with a fleet over 600 vehicles. This road is linked to coastal cities like and Galle and Matara by Southern Highway with a travel time of 2-2.15 hours to Matara.

Rail 
A high-speed rail system is proposed to connect from the city of Negombo to city of Colombo via BIA airport by an electrified high-speed rail link to Colombo Fort where it will link to the proposed Colombo Light Rail. Currently Puttalam - Colombo Fort rail is active using several Diesel Engine powered trains. Passengers can get the train from Katunayake Railway Station.

Sea 
Cinnamon Air operates scheduled seaplane flights from Seeduwa Dadugam Oya near the airport using DHC-6-100 aircraft.

SLAF Katunayake

In 1956 with the departure of the RAF from RAF Negombo, the Royal Ceylon Air Force took over and renamed the station RCyAF Katunayake. With the construction of the Bandaranaike International Airport, major portion of the air base was taken over. However the Sri Lanka Air Force remained and expanded its air base adjoining the International Airport. At present it is the largest SLAF station in the country and is the airfield for several flying squadrons as well as ground units. The Air Force Hospital is also based at SLAF Katunayake.

In March 2001, on the 50th anniversary of the Sri Lanka Air Force, the airfield was presented with the President's Colours.

Formations based at SLAF Katunayake 

 No. 2  Heavy Transport Squadron
 No. 5 Fighter Squadron
 No. 10 Fighter Squadron
 No. 26 Regiment Wing
 No. 43 Colour Wing 
 No. 48 Air Dog Unit
 Aircraft  Engineering Wing
 General  Engineering Wing
 Mechanical  Transport Repair and Overhaul Wing
 Electronics and Telecommunication Wing
 Civil  Engineering Wing
 Mechanical  & Electrical Engineering Wing
 Radar  Maintenance Wing
 
 Aircraft  Overhaul Wing
 No. 1 Air Defence Radar Squadron
 No. 1 Supply and Maintenance Depot
 Aircraft  Spares Depot
 Air Force Hospital
 Air Force Dental Hospital
 Equipment  Provisioning and Accounting Unit
 Air Force Band
 No. 3 Leisure and Recreation Wing
 Research and Development Wing
 Fire  School and Fire Tender Maintenance Squadron
 Armament Repair and Overhaul Wing
 Construction  Machinery Wing

Accidents and incidents
 On 4 December 1974, Martinair Flight 138, a Douglas DC-8 operating by Garuda Indonesia flew into the side of a mountain while on landing approach to Bandaranaike. The pilots had mistakenly believed that a power station near a mountainous area was the airport. All 191 passengers and crew on board were killed.
 On 15 November 1978, Icelandic Airlines Flight 001, a Douglas DC-8 operating by Garuda Indonesian Airways on a charter hajj flight, crashed into a coconut plantation while on approach to Katunayake, Sri Lanka for a refueling stop. 183 out of 262 people on board were killed.
 3 May 1986 – Air Lanka Flight 512. In an operation carried out by the Liberation Tigers of Tamil Eelam (LTTE or Tamil Tigers), a bomb in an Air Lanka (now SriLankan Airlines) Lockheed L-1011 TriStar 100 exploded while passengers where boarding for a short-hop flight to Malé, in the Maldives. 14 passengers were killed, and the aircraft was written off.
 24 March 2000 – An Antonov 12BK operated by cargo carrier Sky Cabs crashed due to lack of fuel. It crashed into two houses killing four people on the ground and six of the eight crew on board.
 24 July 2001 – Bandaranaike Airport attack. 14 members of the LTTE Black Tiger suicide squad infiltrated Katunayake air base and destroyed eight military aircraft on the tarmac. Moving to the civilian airport, they destroyed two Airbus aircraft and damaged three others. Seven government personnel were killed.
 4 February 2004 – An Ilyushin 18D cargo plane operated by Phoenix Aviation and chartered by the Sri Lankan cargo company Expo Aviation was landing in Colombo on a flight from Dubai. The copilot incorrectly set the altimeter and the landing gear contacted the surface of the sea,  short of the runway. A belly landing was performed  to the right of the runway.
 8 September 2005 – While a Saudia Boeing 747 taxied for takeoff on an international flight from Colombo to Jeddah, Saudi Arabia, air traffic controllers received an anonymous telephone call concerning a possible bomb on the aircraft. The crew was informed about this call and elected to perform an emergency evacuation. As a result of the evacuation, there were 62 injuries among the 420 passengers and 22 crew members. One of the passengers died as a result of injuries received during the evacuation, and 17 passengers were hospitalized. No explosive device was found during a search of the aircraft.
 25 March 2007 – At 00:45 the Tamil Tigers bombed the Sri Lanka Air Force base adjoining the international airport. Three Air Force personnel were killed and 16 injured when light aircraft dropped two bombs, although no aircraft were damaged. Passengers already on aircraft were disembarked and led to a shelter, while others trying to reach the airport were turned away and approach roads closed. The airport was temporarily shut down following the incident, but normal flights resumed at 03:30.
 21 April 2019 - An IED was discovered in the airport, which was intended for the attacks as part of the 2019 Sri Lanka Easter bombings, but was quickly defused by the Sri Lankan Air Force.

See also
 Visa policy of Sri Lanka
 Colombo–Katunayake Expressway
 List of airports in Sri Lanka
 Colombo International Airport, Ratmalana, secondary international airport serving Colombo.
 Mattala Rajapaksa International Airport, Hambantota

References

Citations

Bibliography

External links

 Official website of the Bandaranaike International Airport
 Sri Lanka Air Force Base Katunayake

Airports in Sri Lanka
Airports established in 1944
Transport buildings and structures in Gampaha District
World War II sites in Sri Lanka
1944 establishments in Ceylon